Sergei Sergeevich Brukhonenko (30 April 1890 in Kozlov – 20 April 1960) was a Soviet physician, biomedical scientist and technologist during the Stalinist era. Brukhonenko's research was vital to the development of open-heart procedures in Russia. He was one of the leaders of the Research Institute of Experimental Surgery, where Professor Alexander Vishnevsky performed the first Soviet open-heart operation in 1957.

Brukhonenko is primarily remembered for his development of the autojektor, one of the first heart and lung machines. The device was used with mixed results in a series of experiments with canines during the year 1939, which can be seen in the film Experiments in the Revival of Organisms. While some today speculate that the film is a re-staging of the procedures, the experiments themselves were well documented, and resulted in Brukhonenko being posthumously awarded the prestigious Lenin Prize.
Brukhonenko was also known for his experiments of decapitating animals (mainly dogs) and attempting to put them on life support thus keeping the head alive for multiple hours.

External links
  Biography and documentation to the experiment

Experiments in the Revival of Organisms at the Internet Archive (public domain)
 Information and patents related to the autojektor
 Sergei S. Bryukhonenko A Spanish article

1890 births
1960 deaths
People from Michurinsk
People from Kozlovsky Uyezd
Russian medical researchers
Russian inventors
Soviet inventors
20th-century scientists
Soviet surgeons
Russian military personnel of World War I
Lenin Prize winners